Michael Patsalos-Fox (born 1953) is the chairman, president and CEO at Vidyo in New Jersey. He also is the chairman of Teaneck, New Jersey-based Cognizant Technology Solutions. He was formerly a senior partner and chairman of the Americas at management consultancy McKinsey & Company.

Early life and education
Patsalos-Fox was born in Cyprus and raised in Australia. He graduated from the University of Sydney with a B.S. in pure mathematics and received an MBA from the IMD, Switzerland.

Career
He began his career at Fujitsu, Australia, in technical marketing and joined McKinsey & Company in 1982. Over a 28-year career at McKinsey he led the New York office, the North American Corporate Finance practice, and the Americas region. He moved from the London office to the New York office in 1996 and was a frontrunner in the managing director elections of both Ian Davis in 2003 and Dominic Barton in 2009.

He was also a member of the board of directors of the Partnership for New York City.

In July 2012, Patsalos-Fox announced his impending retirement from McKinsey and was elected to the board of directors at Cognizant Technology Solutions Corporation.

Since November 2013, he has been CEO of Stroz Friedberg, a computer forensics and electronic discovery services firm headquartered in New York City.

References

External links
 Official Bio

Living people
McKinsey & Company people
1953 births
20th-century American businesspeople